Leya Evelyn is a Canadian artist.

Life and work

Born in Washington, DC, Evelyn attended Brown University and Yale University (studying under Josef Albers). She emigrated to Nova Scotia in the 1980s. She is noted for her abstract art integrating pieces of photographs. Evelyn teaches at the Nova Scotia College of Art and Design. She was inducted into the Royal Canadian Academy of Arts in 2011. Her paintings are shown by galleries in Halifax, Calgary, Edmonton, San Francisco, New York, Switzerland and Denmark.

References

Canadian women painters
Living people
Artists from Washington, D.C.
Canadian abstract artists
Brown University alumni
Yale University alumni
Academic staff of NSCAD University
20th-century Canadian painters
21st-century Canadian painters
20th-century Canadian women artists
21st-century Canadian women artists
1937 births
Members of the Royal Canadian Academy of Arts